Keshtargah may refer to:
 Keshtargah, Semnan